Maurice-Adolphe Gaidon (17 January 1928 – 14 November 2011) was the Roman Catholic bishop of the Roman Catholic Diocese of Cahors, France.

Ordained to the priesthood in 1956, Gaidon became a bishop in 1973 retiring in 2004.

Notes

1928 births
2011 deaths
Clergy from Dijon
Bishops of Cahors